Bajardiha is a census town in Varanasi tehsil of  Varanasi district in the Indian state of Uttar Pradesh. The census town does not have a gram panchayat.  Bajardiha Census town is about 6 kilometers South of Varanasi railway station, 320 kilometers South-East of Lucknow and 266 kilometers West of Patna.

Demography
Bajardiha  has 1,141 families with a total population of 7,377. Sex ratio of the census town is 915 and child sex ratio is 1,066. Uttar Pradesh state average for both ratios is 912 and 902 respectively  .

Transportation
Bajardiha  is connected by air (Lal Bahadur Shastri Airport), by train (Varanasi railway station) and by road. Nearest  operational airports is Lal Bahadur Shastri Airport and nearest  operational railway station is Manduadih Railway station Varanasi railway station (28 and 1 & 6 kilometers respectively from Bajardiha).

See also
 Varanasi district
 Varanasi (Lok Sabha constituency)
 Varanasi South (Assembly constituency)
 Varanasi tehsil

Notes

  All  demographic data is based on 2011 Census of India.

References 

Census towns in Varanasi district
Cities and towns in Varanasi district